N'Dèye Binta Dia (born 8 April 1973) is a retired Senegalese athlete who specialised in sprinting events. She represented her country at the 1992 Summer Olympics as well as one outdoor and three indoor World Championships.

Competition record

Personal bests
Outdoor
100 metres – 11.55 (+1.0 m/s, Geneva 1996)
Indoor
60 metres – 7.37 (Liévin 1996) NR
200 metres – 24.09 (Liévin 1996)

References

External links
All-Athletics profile

1969 births
Living people
Senegalese female sprinters
Olympic athletes of Senegal
Athletes (track and field) at the 1992 Summer Olympics
World Athletics Championships athletes for Senegal
Olympic female sprinters